Coolie Killer is a 1982 Hong Kong action film directed by Terry Tong and starring Charlie Chin, Elliot Ngok, Lisa Chiao Chiao and Cecilia Yip.

Plot
Ko Tat-fu (Charlie Chin), leader of a coolie killer group in Sai Ying Pun who specializes in assassinations in countries, is now the boss of a shipping company in Central, Hong Kong. However, one time, after an ambushed by a group of killers which left four of his underlings dead, he re-assumed his old profession. Ko believes the ambush was related to his refusal of a recent contract to kill someone in Hong Kong. He asks his lover, Hung-kam (Lisa Chiao Chiao) to investigate in to this, but she commits suicide. Ko is determined to battle for the truth. During a rainy night, when Ko takes out his foes, he ends his legendary and romantic life.

Cast
Charlie Chin as Ko Tat-fu
Elliot Ngok as Inspector Chung
Lisa Chiao Chiao as Cheung Hung-kam
Cecilia Yip as Tong Ho-yee
Michael Tong as Siu
Poon Chun-wai as Mak
Newton Lai as Wor
Danny Lee as Chung's boss (cameo)
Kwan Hoi-san as Choi (cameo)
Lau Siu-ming as Ding
Chan Shen
Lau Hok-nin as Man
Hui Ying-sau as Old doctor
Alex Ng as gets stuffed in garbage can
Chan Chik-wai
Cheung Hei
Steve Mak
To wai-wo
Wong Ha-fei
Wong Kung-miu
Chow Kin-ping
Fung Ming
Chan Ling-wai
Tony Tam
Ng Kit-keung
Ronnie

Reception

Critical
Kenneth Brorsson of So Good Reviews gave the film a positive review and writes "Great, more theme – and character based flicks would follow but Coolie Killer offers up a glimpse of why a story of nasty men fighting for own selfish revenge and not silly illusions of love is so pleasurable."

Box office
The film grossed HK$5,532,180 at the Hong Kong box office during its theatrical run from 3 June to 14 July 1982 in Hong Kong.

Award nominations
2nd Hong Kong Film Awards
Nominated: Best Film
Nominated: Best Cinematography (David Chung, Bryan Lai)
Nominated: Best Film Editing (David Wu)

References

External links

Coolie Killer at Hong Kong Cinemagic

1982 films
1980s action thriller films
1980s crime thriller films
Hong Kong action thriller films
Hong Kong crime thriller films
Gun fu films
1980s Cantonese-language films
Films set in Hong Kong
Films shot in Hong Kong
Films about contract killing
1982 directorial debut films
1980s Hong Kong films